René Blancard (12 March 1897 – 5 November 1965) was a French film actor. He appeared in 80 films between 1922 and 1965.

Selected filmography

 The Mysteries of Paris (1922) - Bras-Rouge
 Montmartre (1925) - Frédéric Charançon
 La Joueuse d'orgue (1925) - Henri Savane
 Un coup de rouge (1937)
 Beautiful Star (1938) - Le commissaire
 Monsieur Coccinelle (1941) - Presto (uncredited)
  (1941) - Ferdinand
 The Murderer Lives at Number 21 (1942) - Picard (uncredited)
  (1943) - L'employé (uncredited)
 Strange Inheritance (1943) - Le directeur du théâtre (uncredited)
  (1943) - Itchoua
 La Main du diable (1943) - Le chirurgien (uncredited)
 Au Bonheur des Dames (1943) - Colomban
 Les Roquevillard (1943)
  (1943) - Gourier
 Mermoz (1943)
 Vautrin (1943) - Coquard (uncredited)
 A Cage of Nightingales (1945) - Monsieur Rachin
 Le dernier sou (1946) - L'avocat général
 Raboliot (1946) - Le garde-chasse Bourrel
 Mensonges (1946) - Joseph - le chauffeur
 Gates of the Night (1946) - Le voisin de palier
  (1947) - Morgain
  (1947) - Goujon
  (1947) - Le notaire
 Miroir (1947) - Boisrond
 Quai des Orfèvres (1947) - Le commissaire principal de la P.J. 
 Danger de mort (1947) - Philippe Chauvieux
 La fleur de l'âge (1947)
 Route sans issue (1948) - André Fournier
 Manù il contrabbandiere (1948) - Brigadiere dei gendarmi
 Le Dessous des cartes (1948) - Le brigadier 
  (1948) - Goujon
  (1948) - Le commissaire
  (1948) - Thomas
 56 Rue Pigalle (1949) - Lucien Bonnet
  (1949) - Le colonel Pérignon
 The Cupid Club (1949) - Turnier
  (1949) - Inspecteur Simonet
 L'Épave (1949) - Alexandrini
 Le Grand Rendez-vous (1950) - Commissaire Basquet
 La Marie du port (1950) - Dorchain
 A Certain Mister (1950) - Le commissaire Bellefontaine
 No Pity for Women (1950) - Me Tirgen, l'avocat
 Oriental Port (1950) - Baptiste
 Sous le ciel de Paris (1951) - Le professeur Bertelin
 Rue des Saussaies (1951) - L'inspecteur Martial
 Duel in Dakar (1951) - Doirel, chef du S.R.
 Le Plaisir (1952) - Le maire (segment "La Maison Tellier")
 We Are All Murderers (1952) - Albert Pichon
  (1952) - Monsieur Victor
 Double or Quits (1953) - Maîtee Albert Chassagne
 Follow That Man (1953) - Dr. Corbier
  (1953) - Jaltex
 Endless Horizons (1953) - René Gaudin
 Monsieur Scrupule, Gangster (1953)
 Tempest in the Flesh (1954) - Le bistro
 The Unfrocked One (1954) - M. Lacassagne
 Quay of Blondes (1954) - Commissaire Brochant
 Adam Is Eve (1954) - M Beaumont
 Marchandes d'illusions (1954) - Le commissaire Denys
 La Reine Margot (1954) - Petit rôle (uncredited)
 Stopover in Orly (1955) - Martin, directeur d'Air France
 Mademoiselle from Paris (1955) - Le père de Micheline
 To Catch a Thief (1955) - Commissaire Lepic (uncredited)
 A Missionary (1955) - Rouhaut
  (1955) - Clifton
 If Paris Were Told to Us (1956) - Aubineau
  (1956) - M. Dupré
 Calle Mayor (1956) - Editor
 Miss Catastrophe (1957) - Denys
 Les Suspects (1957) - Inspecteur Rentier
  (1957) - M. Matheu, le père d'Elisabeth
 Serenade of Texas (1958) - Le shérif
  (1959) - M. Boulard
  (1959) - L'huissier (uncredited)
Julie the Redhead (1959) - M. Lavigne, le père d'Édouard
 Secret professionnel (1959) - Delmotte
 Green Harvest (1959) - M. Borelli
 The Truth (1960) - Advocate General
 Jusqu'à plus soif (1962) - Le brigadier Lesourd
 A King Without Distraction (1963) - Le curé
 Passeport diplomatique agent K 8 (1965) - Raddel (final film role)

References

External links

1897 births
1965 deaths
French male film actors
French male silent film actors
Male actors from Paris
20th-century French male actors